China competed as hosts at the 2019 Military World Games in Wuhan from 18 to 27 October 2019. This was the nation's 7th successive appearance at the Military World Games. China sent a delegation consisting of 553 athletes for the games, which was also the highest number of athletes sent by a nation at the Military World Games. Volleyball player Yuan Xinyue was the flagbearer during the opening ceremony. China finished the event with 239 medals and topped the medal table.

Basketball

Men's tournament

Women's tournament

Football

Men's tournament

Women's tournament

Volleyball

Men's tournament

Group stage

Semi-finals

Gold medal match

Women's tournament

Group stage

Semi finals

Gold medal match

Medal summary

Medal by sports

Medalists 

Source

Records 
Lu Pinpin set the world record in women's 500m obstacle race during the military pentathlon event.

Controversy 
Chinese orienteering teams comprising both men and women counterparts were disqualified and their results were also rejected by the event organizers citing cheating offenses on the athletes for using illegal secret paths and markings with the assistance of spectators to claim medals in the individual middle distance events. China originally claimed a gold and a silver medal in women's category as well as a silver in men's category prior to the disqualification. The issue was later notified by the International Orienteering Federation announced officially that the medals won't be counted as part of the multi-sport event and clarified on the disqualification of the Chinese athletes.

References 

Nations at the 2019 Military World Games
2019 in Chinese sport